Kotada Bhadli is an archaeological site of the Indus Valley civilisation.

Excavation 
Evidence of dairy production has also been found at the site.

See also 

 List of Indus Valley Civilisation sites

References 

Indus Valley civilisation sites